Talod railway station is a railway station on Ahmedabad–Udaipur Line under the Ahmedabad railway division of the Western Railway zone. This is situated beside Majara Road at Madhavgadh, Talod in Sabarkantha district of the Indian state of Gujarat.

References

Ahmedabad railway division
Railway stations in Sabarkantha district